Traveline is a public transport route planner service provided by a partnership between local authorities and transport operators in the UK to provide impartial and comprehensive information about public transport which has operated since 2000. It prepares comprehensive public transport data for the UK and provides a number of regional public transport journey planners.

History

Following on from a successful prototype one-number travel service developed by Lancashire County Council in 1999, the national Traveline organisation was established in 2000.

A prototype national door-to-door journey for Great Britain (i.e. UK without Northern Ireland) - using the Lancashire Traveline model for regional journey planners - was available for evaluation by 'stakeholders and key opinion formers' by November 2003, and the service was officially launched by Secretary of State for Transport Alistair Darling on 31 December 2004.

In March 2010, Prime Minister Gordon Brown announced that the NaPTAN dataset would be released as Open Data.

Operation

The Traveline regions assemble the public transport information within their areas and make it available through a number of local public transport journey planners. As of May 2014, all regions provide information for use within the Google Maps journey planner, and as of December 2016 all regions were added to the Apple Maps journey planner.

Details of all bus stops in the country are assembled into the National Public Transport Access Nodes database (NaPTAN) which is updated daily. The organisation also maintains the associated National Public Transport Gazetteer of all place names, both formal and informal, that may be used to indicate the destination for a requested journey. These datasets are provided to both Google Maps and OpenStreetMap. They have also been released as Open Data via data.gov.uk.

Public transport schedules were provided for use with the Transport Direct Portal on a weekly basis for use within the 'national journey planner for Great Britain' until this portal was closed in September 2014.

Once a year all the schedules for the county by all modes (including the information collected and maintained by Traveline) is assembled into the National Public Transport Data Repository which is prepared every October is used for the creation of Core Accessibility Indicators for every part of the UK. This data is also used within products such as MySociety's Mapumental.

Some bus operators provide information via the Electronic Bus Service Registration system using the TransXChange when passing information between operators, the Vehicle & Operator Services Agency and Traveline.

Organisational structure
For operational and data preparation purposes the UK is divided in the following regions/nations: The boundaries are not identical to the Regions of England.

Advisory body
The advisory body of the national organisation consists of the following organisations:-
 Confederation of Passenger Transport
 Rail Delivery Group
 Local Government Association
 Confederation of Scottish Local Authorities
 Transport for London
 Passenger Transport Executives Group
 Association of Transport Coordinating Officers
 Welsh Government
 Scottish Government
 Department for Transport
 Translink

References

External links
Traveline official website

British travel websites
Public transport information systems
Route planning websites